Jardín Botánico de San Fernando is a botanical garden located next to the Parque Natural de la Bahía de Cádiz in San Fernando in the Province of Cádiz, Andalusia, Spain. Established in 2001, it covers an area of about 9 acres.

See also
 List of botanical gardens in Andalusia

References

Buildings and structures in San Fernando, Cádiz
Botanical gardens in Andalusia
2001 establishments in Spain
Parks in Andalusia